The 2018–19 Divizia A is the 61st season of the Romanian men's handball second league. A total of 24 teams contested the league, being divided in four series, Seria A (6 teams), Seria B (7 teams), Seria C (5 teams) and Seria D (6 teams). At the end of the season the first two places from each series will qualify for the Divizia A promotion play-off.

Team changes

To Divizia A
Relegated from Liga Națională
 CSM Vaslui
 Odorheiu Secuiesc

From Divizia A
Promoted to Liga Națională
 CSM Bacău
 HC Buzău
 Universitatea Cluj

Excluded teams
 ADEP Satu Mare
 CNE Sighișoara
 Politehnica Iași

Other teams
 CSM Bacău, CSU Suceava and Potaissa Turda enrolled their second teams CSM II, CSU II and Potaissa II.
 CSM Ploiești, CSU Pitești and Unirea Sânnicolau Mare were enrolled in the league.
 Atletico Alexandria and HC Vaslui were renamed as CSM Alexandria and CSM Vaslui.

Teams for 2018–19

Seria A

Seria B

Seria C

Seria D

League tables

Seria A

Seria B

Seria C

Seria D

Promotion play-offs

Semi-final tournament
The first two eligible teams from each series of the regular season will compete in two main group which will be played in a neutral venue. The first two ranked teams from each group of the semi-final tournament will qualify for the Final Four. The semi-final tournament was played on neutral ground, in Brașov.

Group 1

Group 2

Final Four
The Final Four was played on neutral ground, in Ploiești.

League table – positions 1–4

Promotion/relegation play-offs
The 3rd and 4th-placed teams of the Divizia A promotion tournament faced the 11th and 12th-placed teams of the Liga Națională. The first two places promoted to Liga Națională and the last two relegated to Divizia A. The play-offs were played on neutral ground, in Drobeta-Turnu Severin.

References

External links
 Romanian Handball Federaration 

Divizia A (men's handball)
2018 in Romanian sport
2019 in Romanian sport
2018–19 domestic handball leagues